Ahmadabad (also Romanized as Aḩmadābād) is a village in Rezvaniyeh Rural District, in the Central District of Tiran and Karvan County, Isfahan Province, Iran. At the 2006 census, its population was 21, in 10 families.

References 

Populated places in Tiran and Karvan County